The Anglesey Artillery Volunteers was a group of part-time units of the British Army in the Welsh island and county of Anglesey from 1860 to 1878.

Formation
The enthusiasm for the Volunteer movement following an invasion scare in 1859 saw the creation of many Rifle, Artillery and Engineer Volunteer Corps composed of part-time soldiers eager to supplement the Regular British Army in time of need. The Welsh island of Anglesey formed three artillery volunteer corps (AVCs) on 14 December 1860:
 1st (Holyhead) Anglesey AVC under Captain John Jacobs
 2nd (Holyhead) Anglesey AVC under Capt Charles Rigby
 3rd (Beaumaris) Anglesey AVC under Capt William H. Weldon

Service
The Hon William Owen Stanley, MP for Beaumaris, succeeded Jacobs as captain of the 1st AVC on 7 March 1861. On 28 August 1863 the three Anglesey units and the small 1st Carnarvonshire AVC at Caernarfon, just across the Menai Strait, were brought together as the 1st Administrative Brigade, Anglesey Artillery Volunteers, under the command of Capt Stanley, who was promoted to major. The admin brigade had its headquarters (HQ) at Holyhead.

However, interest in the 2nd AVC fell away and it was disbanded by July 1868. This meant that the 1st Admin Bde only contained three batteries, and in 1873 it was absorbed into the 1st Administrative Brigade, Cheshire Artillery Volunteer Corps . Recruitment in Anglesey continued to decline and the 1st (Holyhead) AVC disappeared in 1875. By 1878 most of the 3rd (Beaumaris) AVC were actually Carnarvonshire men from Bangor and the surrounding district. In November that year it was formally redesignated as the 2nd Carnarvonshire AVC, and no artillery volunteer units remained headquartered in Anglesey. When the 1st Cheshire Admin Bde was consolidated as the 1st Cheshire and Carnarvonshire AVC in 1880, the 2nd Carnarvon provided Nos 6 and 7 Companies at Bangor.

Footnotes

Notes

References
 Ian F.W. Beckett, Riflemen Form: A Study of the Rifle Volunteer Movement 1859–1908, Aldershot: Ogilby Trusts, 1982, ISBN 0 85936 271 X.
 J.B.M. Frederick, Lineage Book of British Land Forces 1660–1978, Vol II, Wakefield: Microform Academic, 1984, ISBN 1-85117-009-X.
 Norman Litchfield & Ray Westlake, The Volunteer Artillery 1859–1908 (Their Lineage, Uniforms and Badges), Nottingham: Sherwood Press, 1982, ISBN 0-9508205-0-4.
 Bryn Owen, History of the Welsh Militia and Volunteer Corps 1757–1908: 1: Anglesey and Caernarfonshire, Caernarfon: Palace Books, 1989, ISBN 1-871904-00-5.

Anglesey
Military units and formations in Anglesey
Holyhead
Military units and formations in Wales
Military units and formations established in 1860
Military units and formations disestablished in 1878